Coding may refer to:

Computer science
 Computer programming, the process of creating and maintaining the source code of computer programs
 Line coding, in data storage
 Source coding, compression used in data transmission
 Coding theory
 Channel coding, in coding theory

Other uses
 Coding (social sciences), an analytical process in which data are categorized for analysis
 Coding strand of DNA in molecular biology
 Legal coding, the process of creating summary or keyword data from a document in the legal profession
 Medical coding, representation of medical diagnoses and procedures in standard code numbers
 Queer coding
Coding Theory

See also
 Code
 Entropy encoding
 Transform coding